Evergestis dumerlei is a species of moth in the family Crambidae. It is found in France, Spain and North Africa, including Morocco.

The wingspan is 19–26 mm. Adults are on wing from the end of August to the beginning of October.

References

Moths described in 2003
Evergestis
Moths of Europe
Moths of Africa